Yashpal (1903–1976), was a Hindi-language author.

Yashpal may also refer to:

Given name

Surname
Kim Yashpal, Indian actress and model

See also
Yash Pal (1926–2017), Indian scientist, educator and educationist